Younès Sekkat (born 29 April 1974) is a Moroccan former taekwondo practitioner. He competed in the men's 58 kg event at the 2000 Summer Olympics.

References

External links
 

1974 births
Living people
Moroccan male taekwondo practitioners
Olympic taekwondo practitioners of Morocco
Taekwondo practitioners at the 2000 Summer Olympics
Place of birth missing (living people)
20th-century Moroccan people
21st-century Moroccan people